The 2019 Tour du Rwanda was a road cycling stage race that took place between 24 February and 3 March 2019. The race was rated as a 2.1 event as part of the 2019 UCI Africa Tour, and was the 22nd edition of the Tour du Rwanda.

Teams
Seventeen teams started the race. Each team had a maximum of five riders:

UCI WorldTeams

 

UCI Professional Continental Teams

 
 
 
 

UCI Continental Teams

 
 
 
 
 NiCe–Ethiopia Cycling Team
 

National Teams

 Algeria
 Cameroon
 Eritrea
 France U23
 Kenya
 Rwanda

Route

Stages

Stage 1

Stage 2

Stage 3

Stage 4

Stage 5

Stage 6

Stage 7

Stage 8

Classification leadership table

Classifications

References

2019
2019 UCI Africa Tour
2019 in Rwandan sport